The Department of Small Business Development (DSBD) is one of the ministries of the South African government. It was established in 2014 to support small businesses and cooperatives. The current political head of the department is the Minister of Small Business Development, Stella Ndabeni-Abrahams who replaced Khumbudzo Ntshavheni in 2021.

Entities
Small Enterprise Development Agency (SEDA)
Small Enterprise Finance Agency (SEFA)

References

External links
Official website

Small Business Developmnent
Economy of South Africa